The Teenage Psychic is a 2017 Taiwanese television miniseries. It is an adaptation of Chen He Yu's 2013 short film The Busy Young Psychic (神算). It stars Kuo Shu-yao, Kent Tsai, Akio Chen, Alina Zheng and Sylvia Hsieh . Filming began on July 19, 2016. First original broadcast began on April 2, 2017 on PTS.

Synopsis
Xie Ya Zhen is a high school student who is born with psychic abilities. At night, she works at the temple as a Xian-gu (仙姑) to help believers.

Cast

Main cast
Kuo Shu-yao as Xie Ya Zhen
Kent Tsai as He Yun Le
Akio Chen as Jin Sheng Zai
Alina Cheng as Huang Qiao Wei
Sylvia Hsieh as Zhang Nian Wen

Supporting cast
Tiger Wang as Huang Xin Ren
Lin He-xuan as Lin Bao Ming
Hong Qun-jun as Hong Jun Bao
Xiang Cheng-yu as Chen Meng Da
Zhang Wei as Zhang Wei
Lin Si-ting as Lin Si Ting
Ye Zi-yan as Teacher Zhu
Li Ying-hong as Ah Hong
Wu Hong-xiu as Ah Xiu

Soundtrack 
Untitled Daily 無題日常 by Mu Liang Zhen Zhen
Never Come Back 不曾回來過 by Lee Chien-na

Awards and nominations

References

External links 
 －PTS
 －HBO Asia
 

2017 Taiwanese television series debuts
2017 Taiwanese television series endings
Public Television Service original programming
HBO Asia original programming
2010s high school television series
2010s supernatural television series
Television series about teenagers